Tha Mai is a district (amphoe) of Chanthaburi province, eastern Thailand.

History
The district was created in 1900, then named Khamong (โขมง). Four years later the district office was moved to the area of Wat Khao Phloi Waen, and the district name was changed accordingly to Phloi Waen (พลอยแหวน). When in 1917 the office was moved to Tambon Tha Mai, the district name was changed to be same as the central tambon.

Geography
Neighboring districts are (from the west clockwise) Na Yai Am, Kaeng Hang Maeo, Khao Khitchakut, Mueang Chanthaburi and Laem Sing of Chanthaburi Province. To the southwest is the Gulf of Thailand.

Administration
The district is divided into 14 sub-districts (tambons), which are further subdivided into 124 villages (mubans). There are three sub-district municipalities (thesaban tambons): Tha Mai covers tambons Tha Mai and Yai Ra, Noen Sung covers parts of tambon Khao Wua and Khao Baisi, and Nong Khla covers parts of Thung Bencha. There are a further 12 tambon administrative organizations (TAO).

Missing numbers belong to tambons which now form districts Kaeng Hang Maeo and Na Yai Am.

In media
Tha Mai is regarded as a small district that is quiet and people have a traditional way of life. It is therefore used as a filming location and as the backdrop for Where We Belong, a drama film of popular girlgroup teen idol BNK48. The film released in mid-2019 directed and screenplay by Kongdej Jaturanrasamee.

References

External links
amphoe.com (Thai)
Thamai.net (English)

Tha Mai